The 2018–19 Alabama A&M Bulldogs basketball team represents Alabama A&M University during the 2018–19 NCAA Division I men's basketball season. The Bulldogs, led by interim head coach Dylan Howard, play their home games at the Elmore Gymnasium in Normal, Alabama as members of the Southwestern Athletic Conference.

For the second season in a row, Alabama A&M will be ineligible for postseason play due to APR violations.

Previous season
The Bulldogs finished the season 3–28, 3–15 in SWAC play to finish in last place. Alabama A&M was ineligible for postseason play due to APR violations.

On May 11, 2018, head coach Donnie Marsh resigned after just one season marking the second consecutive year the school's head coach had resigned following the season. Six days later, A&M associate head coach Dylan Howard was named interim head coach of the team for the 2018–19 season.

Roster

Schedule and results

|-
!colspan=12 style=|Non-conference regular season

|-
!colspan=12 style=| SWAC regular season

References

Alabama A&M Bulldogs basketball seasons
Alabama AandM
Alabama AandM
Alabama AandM